Niky is a nickname and given name. Notable people with the name include:

Niky Kamran (born 1959), Belgian mathematician
Niky Wardley (born 1973), English actress actually named Nichola Petra Wardley

See also

Nicky
Nikky